The 8 May 1945 Stadium is a multi-use stadium in Sétif, Algeria. It is currently used mostly for football matches and is the home ground of ES Sétif. The stadium has a capacity of 25,000 spectator.

References

External links
 Stadium file - goalzz.com

8 Mai
Buildings and structures in Sétif Province